José María Andrés Fernando Lezama Lima (December 19, 1910 – August 9, 1976) was a Cuban writer, poet and essayist. He is considered one of the most influential figures in Cuban and Latin American literature. His novel Paradiso is one of the most important works in Spanish and one of the best novels of the 20th Century according to the Spanish newspaper El Mundo.

Lezama is a prominent referent of American Neo-Baroque literature. He created a mature poetic system characterized by its lyricism. His work features a wide variety of metaphors, allusions and allegories which he developed in essays such as Analecta del reloj (1953), La expresión americana (1957), Tratados en La Habana (1958) o La cantidad hechizada (1970).

Biography

Born in the Columbia Military Encampment close to Havana in the city of Marianao where his father was a colonel, Lezama lived through some of the most turbulent times of Cuba's history, fighting against the Machado dictatorship.  His literary output includes the semi-autobiographical, baroque novel Paradiso (1966), the story of a young man and his struggles with his mysterious illness, the death of his father, and his developing sensuality and poetic sensibilities. Lezama Lima also edited several anthologies of Cuban poetry and the magazines Verbum and Orígenes, presiding as the patriarch of Cuban letters for most of his later years.

Lezama Lima spent little time outside of his home country, making a trip to Mexico in 1949 and Jamaica in 1950). Nevertheless, Lezama's poetry, essays and two novels draw images and ideas from a vast array of world cultures and historical time periods.  The Baroque style that he forged relied equally upon his Góngora-influenced syntax and his stunning constellations of unlikely images, which often drew from Ancient Chinese and Egyptian philosophical texts and mythological narratives. Lezama Lima's first published work, the long poem "Muerte de Narciso," brought him national acclaim at the age of twenty-seven and established his well-wrought style and classical subject matter.

In addition to his poems and novels, Lezama wrote many essays on figures of world literature such as Stéphane Mallarmé, Valéry, Góngora and Rimbaud as well as on Latin American baroque aesthetics. Most notably the essays published as La Expresión Americana lay out his vision of the European baroque, its relation to the classical, and the American baroque.

Lezama Lima died in 1976 at age 65 and was buried in the Colon Cemetery, Havana. He was influential for Cuban and Puerto Rican writers of his generation and the next, such as Virgilio Piñera, Reinaldo Arenas, Fernando Velázquez Medina, René Marqués, and Giannina Braschi, who depict his life and works in their writing.

Works

Poetry 
 Muerte de Narciso (1937) 
 Enemigo rumor (1941)
 Aventuras sigilosas (1945)
 La fijeza (1949)
 Dador (1960)
 Fragmentos a su imán (1978)

Novels 
 Paradiso (1966)
 Oppiano Licario (1977)

Essays 
 Analecta del reloj (1953)
 La expresión americana (1957)
 Tratados en La Habana (1958)
 La cantidad hechizada (1970)

See also 

 Cuban literature
 Puerto Rican literature
 Caribbean literature

References

Further reading
 Baroque New Worlds: Representation, Transculturation, Counterconquest, ed. Lois Parkinson Zamora, Monika Kaup (Duke UP, 2010)
 Jose Lezama Lima: Selections, ed. Ernesto Livon-Grosman (Poets for the Millennium, 4, UC Press, 2005)
 Reading anew : José Lezama Lima's rhetorical investigations, Juan Pablo Lupi (Iberoamericana, 2012)
 Assimilation/Generation/Resurrection: Contrapuntal Readings in the Poetry of José Lezama Lima, Ben A. Heller (Bucknell UP, 1997)
 From Modernism to Neo-Baroque: James Joyce and Lezama Lima, César Augusto Salgado (Bucknell UP, 2001)
 Una Familia Habanera by Eloisa Lezama-Lima (Ediciones Universal, 1998)
 Solventando las diferencias: la ideología del mestizaje en Cuba. Duno Gottberg, Luis, Madrid, Iberoamericana – Frankfurt am Main, Vervuert, 2003.
 Unmothered Americas: Poetry and universality (on the works of José Lezama Lima, William Carlos Williams, Alejandra Pizarnik, and Giannina Braschi) by Rodriguez Matos, Jaime, Columbia University, 2005.
 Writing of the formless : José Lezama Lima and the end of time, Jaime Rodríguez Matos (Fordham UP, 2017)

External links
 José Lezama Lima Digital Collection at the Cuban Heritage Collection at the University of Miami
Voces on PBS: "Letters to Eloisa" recounts the life of Cuban literary great José Lezama Lima

1910 births
1976 deaths
20th-century essayists
20th-century male writers
20th-century Cuban novelists
20th-century Cuban poets
Cuban essayists
Cuban gay writers
Cuban LGBT poets
Cuban LGBT novelists
Magic realism writers
Male essayists
Gay poets
Gay novelists
Cuban male novelists
Cuban male poets
People from Havana
University of Havana alumni
20th-century Cuban LGBT people